Uwe Barth (born 23 July 1964 in Bad Langensalza, Bezirk Erfurt) is a German politician and member of the FDP.

In 1986 he joined the Liberal Democratic Party of Germany (LDPD), which merged with the FDP in 1990. He was a member of the German Bundestag from 2005 to 2009, representing the state of Thuringia. In the 2009 Thuringia state election he became a member of the Landtag of Thuringia and leader of the FDP Landtag group.

External links

 Uwe Barth's website 

1964 births
Living people
People from Bad Langensalza
Liberal Democratic Party of Germany politicians
Members of the Bundestag for Thuringia
Members of the Landtag of Thuringia
University of Jena alumni
Members of the Bundestag 2005–2009
Members of the Bundestag for the Free Democratic Party (Germany)